was a Japanese manga artist best known for being the illustrator of Tokyo Mew Mew, a manga series she created with Reiko Yoshida. Her first manga story The Sleeping Princess of Berry Forest was written when she was just 18 years old.

Ikumi was diagnosed with a subarachnoid hemorrhage in February 2021, and died on March 7, 2022, from a heart failure brought by the hemorrhage.

Works

References

External links 
 

1979 births
2022 deaths
Deaths from subarachnoid hemorrhage
Manga artists